The Keith Runcorn Prize is awarded annually by the Royal Astronomical Society for the best British doctoral thesis in geophysics (including planetary science). The winner receives a cash prize and presents the results of their thesis at a meeting of the Royal Astronomical Society.

The prize is sponsored by Oxford University Press, and since 2007 named after Keith Runcorn, a British physicist whose paleomagnetic reconstruction of the relative motions of Europe and America revived the theory of continental drift.

Recipients

Source: RAS
2016 Rishy Mistry (Imperial College)
2015 Matteo Ravasi (University of Edinburgh)
2014 Hannah Christensen (née Arnold) (University of Oxford)
2013 Richard Walters (University of Leeds)
2012 Sudipta Sarkar (University of Southampton)
2011 David Kipping (University College London)
2010 James Verdon (University of Bristol)
2009 David Halliday (University of Edinburgh)
2008 David Jess (Queen's University Belfast)
2007 Leigh Fletcher (University of Oxford)
2006 Sophie Bassett (University of Durham)
2005 Phillip Livermore (University of Leeds)
2004 Paul Williams (University of Oxford)
2003 Clare Watt (British Antarctic Survey)
2002 Emma Bunce (University of Leicester)
2001 No award
2000 Dave Skeet (University of Oxford)
1999 Marcus Brüggen (University of Cambridge)
1998 Mark Muller (University of Cambridge)
1997 Cathryn Mitchell (University of Wales at Aberystwyth)
1996 Tim Horbury (Imperial College London)
1995 No award
1994 Tim Henstock (Cambridge)
1993 Sara Russell (Open University)
1992 Douglas Stewart (University of Leeds)
1991 Mark Burgess (University of Newcastle-upon-Tyne)

See also

 List of geophysics awards
 List of prizes named after people

References

Geophysics awards
British awards
Awards established in 1992